The Dodgers–Yankees rivalry is a Major League Baseball (MLB) rivalry between the Los Angeles Dodgers and the New York Yankees. The Dodgers are a member club of the National League (NL) West division, and the Yankees are a member club of the American League (AL) East division. The rivalry between the Dodgers and Yankees is one of the most well-known rivalries in Major League Baseball. The two teams have met 11 times in the World Series, more times than any other pair of teams from the American and National leagues. The initial significance was embodied in the two teams' proximity in New York City, when the Dodgers initially played in Brooklyn while the Yankees played in the Bronx. The regular season series is currently tied 8–8. Although the rivalry's significance arose from the two teams' numerous World Series meetings, the Yankees and Dodgers have not met in the World Series since . They would not play each other in a non-exhibition game until 2004, when they played a 3-game interleague series. Nevertheless, games between the two teams have drawn sellout crowds.

World Series matchups

A new team in town, new stadiums built, Subway Series established

At the dawn of the 20th century, the American League was in its infancy, and one of its charter franchises (which would eventually become the Yankees) was the original Baltimore Orioles. The league, however, recognized that it required a presence in New York City, the country's largest market, in order to survive. Hence, it moved the Orioles to New York, which was already the home of two National League franchises, the Brooklyn Dodgers and New York Giants. The new team was eventually called the New York Highlanders due to their home field being Hilltop Park from 1903–1912.

After the Highlanders allowed the Giants to play at Hilltop Park when the latter's home stadium, the Polo Grounds, was undergoing reconstruction from a fire, the Giants invited the Highlanders to share the Polo Grounds with them. Since the Highlanders were no longer playing at higher elevations, they changed their name to the New York Yankees. The Dodgers also opened up their new field, Ebbets Field, in Brooklyn. Their opening game at the stadium was an exhibition game against the Highlanders on April 5,  where future Yankee manager Casey Stengel had the game-winning hit for the Dodgers. The Highlanders would officially be called the Yankees later that year.

In 1920, the Giants notified the Yankees that they would have to find a new stadium of their own for the 1921 season. The Giants rescinded that eviction notice and allowed the Yankees to stay until the end of the 1922 season, when the Giants renovated the Polo Grounds and increased seating capacity from 38,000 to 50,000. Before that however, the 1921 World Series between the Giants and Yankees became the first Subway Series, as match-ups between the Dodgers and the Giants were not referred to as Subway Series. After losing to the Giants in that World Series and again the following year, the Yankees moved across the Harlem River to the original Yankee Stadium in the Bronx, where they captured their first World Series from the Giants in 1923.

1941: First meeting between the Bronx Bombers and "Dem Bums"

The Yankees and Brooklyn Dodgers first met in the 1941 World Series. In Game 4, with the Yankees leading the series two games to one, the Dodgers led by one going to the top of the ninth inning and, with two outs, just barely missed getting the third out and wound up losing the game. With two outs, the Yankees' Tommy Henrich swung and missed with two strikes, but reached on a passed ball, as Dodger catcher Mickey Owen failed to hold on to the pitch. Henrich reached first base on the play. Owen recalled the incident:

Joe DiMaggio followed Henrich's at bat with a single before Charlie Keller hit a double to drive in both Henrich and DiMaggio and give the Yankees a 5–4 lead. After Bill Dickey walked, he and Keller scored on a Joe Gordon double to make the final score 7–4. The next day, the Yankees clinched the first series match-up between the two teams in the start of what would become a long-lasting rivalry.

1947–53: "Wait 'til next year!"

Six years later, the 1947 World Series had a dramatic moment in Game 6. The Dodgers' Al Gionfriddo was placed in left field for defensive purposes and robbed Joe DiMaggio of a game-tying three-run home run. DiMaggio was visibly disgusted by the outcome of the play when rounding the bases in one of the few emotional displays of his career. The Dodgers won the game and forced a do-or-die Game 7, only to fall.

Dramatic defensive plays would be seen again, this time by the Yankees in the 1952 contest, as Billy Martin came outside the camera coverage area to catch a pop-fly after Brooklyn had threatened to take the lead in Game 7. Martin would go on to be the hero once more in the 1953 series with a series record 12 hits, including the winning hit of the series-clinching game off of Clem Labine.

Brooklyn signed Jackie Robinson to not only break the color line, but to bolster the lineup. Robinson, along with outfielder Duke Snider and pitcher Don Newcombe, sparked Brooklyn to four National League pennants between 1947 and 1953. Every time during this period, however, the World Series ended poorly for the Dodgers and gave the Dodger fans their rallying cry: "Wait 'til next year!"

During the 1953 World Series, long time Dodgers announcer Red Barber refused to man the broadcast booth due to a compensation dispute with Gillette. Barber jumped ship to the Yankees and joined Mel Allen to call the games for the Yankees. Struggling to find a replacement, the Dodgers gave the call to a 25-year-old named Vin Scully, the youngest man to ever call a World Series game for a major network. Scully would continue as a Dodgers broadcaster for another six decades.

1955: "This IS next year!"

Finally, in  the Dodgers reversed matters, prevailing over the Yankees in seven games to win their only World Series in Brooklyn. Thus came the slogan, This IS next year.

1956: Don Larsen's perfect game

Brooklyn fell short of repeating the next season, falling in seven games to the Yankees. That year's team suffered some ignominy in being on the losing end of Don Larsen's perfect game in Game 5, which was the first of only three no-hitters ever pitched in postseason play.

In both the 1955 and 1956 World Series, the home team won the first six games of the World Series, but lost Game 7. It would not be until  when the home team won all seven games of a World Series.

The 1956 World Series would be the last Subway Series of the 1900s and the last to include one of the National League's charter franchises.

1963: Los Angeles Dodgers win
After the Dodgers' move to Los Angeles for the 1958 season, it would take them two dominating pitchers (Sandy Koufax and Don Drysdale), a speedy shortstop (Maury Wills) and a proficient outfielder (Tommy Davis) to spark them to a pennant in 1963.

Dodgers broadcaster Vin Scully said that although the Dodgers won four World Series titles in 10 years, he said that this championship was the biggest of those four because "the ultimate was not only beating the Yankees but sweeping them in four", but said that "to New York fans it was still the old Brooklyn Dodgers and there was a lot of bitterness toward them."

1977: The Bronx is Burning

After 14 years, sophomore manager Tommy Lasorda led a young Dodgers team to the 1977 World Series where they faced Billy Martin and the Yankees. The two managers were involved in a fist fight during the 1956 season while playing for the two teams they were now managing. The Yankees were coming off a controversy ridden season. Furious at their loss to The Big Red Machine in the 1976 World Series, owner George Steinbrenner had signed slugger Reggie Jackson to the team. Jackson immediately created friction in the clubhouse between himself and Bill Martin as well as captain Thurman Munson, the defending AL MVP. New York City itself was going through a financial crisis under Mayor Abraham Beame and experienced the Son of Sam and a major blackout, all chronicled in The Bronx is Burning. Despite the controversy, the Yankees managed to play together and win the pennant to face the Dodgers in the World Series.

The Dodgers featured an infield of Steve Garvey at first, Davey Lopes at second, Ron Cey at third, and Bill Russell at shortstop, in addition to slugger Reggie Smith, and pitching duo (Don Sutton and Tommy John). In addition to Jackson and Munson, the Yankees had Bucky Dent and Graig Nettles, Cy Young Award-winning closer Sparky Lyle, young pitcher Ron Guidry, and speedsters Willie Randolph and Mickey Rivers. The Dodgers appeared primed to win the Series, but Reggie Jackson put on his "Mr. October" show as he hit three home runs in Game 6 off three pitches to lead the Yanks to their first World Series championship since .

1978: Bucky Dent's Playoffs
The next season, the Yankees won their division, thanks in large part to a timely home run from Bucky Dent in a one-game playoff against the Boston Red Sox. They went to the World Series for the third straight year where they faced the Dodgers for the second straight year. The Dodgers won the first two games of the Series thanks to rookie pitcher Bob Welch, but New York won the next four to take the 75th Fall Classic.

1981: Changing of the Guard
In , the fortunes turned in LA's favor, as rookie pitcher Fernando Valenzuela won National League Rookie of the Year and Cy Young Award honors. But the Yankees had American League Rookie of the Year Dave Righetti (who was traded from the Rangers in exchange for Lyle) and the 1–2 relief punch of set-up man Ron Davis and closer Rich Gossage. The Yankees won the first two contests, but LA, led by Valenzuela and first baseman Steve Garvey, won the next four to claim their first World Series title since  in a strike-shortened season. Fallout from the series led to Reggie Jackson being controversially dismissed a bit later, and owner George Steinbrenner started a public feud with Dave Winfield, who had a poor performance in the series. After the series ended, Steinbrenner issued a public apology to the City of New York for his team's performance, while at the same time assuring the fans that plans to put the team together for 1982 would begin immediately. Players and press alike criticized the owner for doing this, as most people felt losing in the World Series was not something that needed to be apologized for.

Lasorda said of the revenge for what Jackson did to the Dodgers in 1977 and 1978: "We were suffering and the guy was making a fool out of us. I was hoping and praying we would get another shot at him."

This led to the Yankees not winning a World Series in the 1980s, one of two decades they would not win a championship since moving to the Bronx (the other being the 2010s). In contrast, the Dodgers were able to defeat the Oakland Athletics in the 1988 World Series. It would be their last post-season meeting to date, the last time ever the Dodgers visited the old Yankee Stadium, and the last meeting between teams from New York City and Los Angeles for a major professional sports championship until the 2014 Stanley Cup Finals.

Rivalry in the 21st Century

Although the Yankees and the Dodgers have not met in the playoffs since the 1981 World Series, interleague matchups between the two teams, whether in New York or Los Angeles, have become popular. Tickets in both cities have become exclusive shortly after going on sale and games between the two teams have drawn sell out crowds, as evidenced during the doubleheader at the new Yankee Stadium in June 2013, the first time the Dodgers visited the Bronx since interleague play was introduced and the first time they visited the new Yankee Stadium.

Interleague matchups and other
After 23 years of not facing the Yankees, LA hosted an interleague weekend series in June 2004 where they took two out of three contests. One ending had closer Éric Gagné strike out Bernie Williams for the final out. The third and final game was the ESPN Sunday Night game that weekend.

The rivalry was renewed when Joe Torre, who led the Yankees to four World Series championships, accepted a three-year, $13 million contract to manage the Dodgers on November 1, 2007. He also brought along former Yankee first baseman Don Mattingly and Larry Bowa to his coaching staff. Coaches Rick Honeycutt and Mariano Duncan each played for both teams. Torre and left fielder Manny Ramirez, who had been a part of the fierce Yankees–Red Sox rivalry before being traded to the Dodgers mid-season, led the Dodgers to the 2008 West Division Pennant. The Yankees failed to make the 2008 postseason, ending their 13-year consecutive postseason appearance streak with 12 of which were under Torre's.

Both teams made it to the playoffs in 2009, but the Dodgers lost in the NLCS for the second straight year to the defending champion Philadelphia Phillies (whom the Dodgers beat in the NLCS in 1977 and 1978 before losing to the Yankees in the World Series in both years), who would lose to the Yankees in the World Series, giving New York their first championship since Torre left as manager.

The Yankees and Dodgers met again at Dodger Stadium for an interleague series June 25–27, 2010. This marked the first time Joe Torre and Don Mattingly faced off against the Yankees as members of the Dodgers.  The Yankees were victorious, 
winning the series two games to one.

Mattingly succeeded Torre as manager of the Dodgers after the 2010 season.

The Dodgers never played a regular season series at the original Yankee Stadium. The teams finally met up during the 2013 season. The double header of June 19 was not just the Dodgers return to the Bronx after a long absence; it was also Mattingly's first return to the Bronx since he became Dodger manager (excluding Mattingly's visit to new Yankee Stadium on the night they honored George Steinbrenner with a monument in Monument Park). Former Dodger pitcher Hiroki Kuroda won the first game for the Yankees while the Dodgers rebounded in the night cap behind the pitching of Chris Capuano. The two then split a 2-game series at Dodger Stadium.

In their September 12–14, 2016 meeting at Yankee Stadium, the Dodgers took two out of three games from the Yankees.

The Dodgers' and Yankees' most recent meeting was August 23–25, 2019 at Dodger Stadium. The Yankees won two contests in a three-game series featuring the teams with the best records in their respective leagues at the time. The 2019 series was held during the annual Players Weekend, with the Yankees wearing all-black uniforms and the Dodgers in all-white uniforms for all three games.

Starting in 2023, the Dodgers and Yankees will play each other every year in the regular-season, with Major League Baseball moving to a more balanced schedule.

See also

Histories
Brooklyn Dodgers
Los Angeles Dodgers
New York Yankees

References

Major League Baseball rivalries
Los Angeles Dodgers
New York Yankees
Interleague play
1941 establishments in New York City